Lieutenant-General Thomas Windsor, 1st Viscount Windsor (8 June 1738), styled The Honourable Thomas Windsor until 1699, was a British Army officer, landowner and Tory politician who sat in the English and British House of Commons between 1685 and 1712. He was then elevated to the British House of Lords as one of Harley's Dozen.

Life 
Windsor was the second son of Thomas Hickman-Windsor, 1st Earl of Plymouth, by his second wife Ursula Widdrington, daughter and co-heiress of Sir Thomas Widdrington, Lord Chief Baron of the Exchequer, and Frances Fairfax. 

He was made a Page of Honour to James II in 1685 (a post he held until the king was deposed in 1688) and a few months later was returned to Parliament for Droitwich, despite being only around sixteen at the time. Lord Willoughby de Eresby wanted both him and Peter Legh (died 1744) expelled as minors. Windsor took no part in the proceedings of Parliament and was not re-elected in 1687.

During the Monmouth Rebellion of 1685 Windsor had served as a cornet in Lord Plymouth's Horse under his father. He continued to serve in the Army as a captain in Sir John Fenwick's Regiment in 1687, as a lieutenant-colonel in Viscount Colchester's Regiment between 1690 and 1694, as a colonel of horse between 1694 and 1697, 1702 and 1707 and 1711 and 1712 and of the 3rd Dragoon Guards between 1712 and 1717. He was promoted to brigadier in 1702, to major-general in 1704 and to lieutenant-general in 1710.

In 1692 he was appointed Groom of the Bedchamber in King William's private household, serving until the King's death in 1702. In 1699 he was elevated to the Peerage of Ireland as Viscount Windsor, of Blackcastle. This being an Irish peerage he was still eligible for election to the English House of Commons, and in 1705 he was once again returned to Parliament for Bramber, a seat he held until 1708.  Between 1708 and 1712 he represented Monmouthshire.  The latter year he was created an English peer as Baron Mountjoy, in the Isle of Wight,  as one of twelve peers created to secure a Tory majority in the House of Lords.

Lord Windsor married Lady Charlotte Herbert, only daughter of Philip Herbert, 7th Earl of Pembroke, and Henriette de Kéroualle (sister of  Louise de Kéroualle, the principal mistress to King Charles II of England), and widow of John Jeffreys, 2nd Baron Jeffreys, in 1703. In 1709, they brought a petition to the House of Lords (which adjudicated on matters of noble titles and estates) seeking permission to sell the Jeffreys estates in order to pay their debts.

They had five children: one son and at least four daughters:
 Herbert Windsor, 2nd Viscount Windsor (1707–1758) ⚭ 1735 Alice Clavering
 Hon. Ursula Windsor ⚭ 1736 John Wadman
 Hon. Charlotte Windsor ⚭ 1736 John Kent
 Hon. Catharine Windsor (1716–1742) ⚭ Mattheus Lestevenon (1715–1797), 
 a daughter who died at a young age

Charlotte died in November 1733. Lord Windsor died in June 1738 and was succeeded in his titles by his son, Herbert.

He inherited the Lower Avon Navigation from his father, who had acquired the rights to it from the future King James II of England.

References

External links

Year of birth uncertain
1738 deaths
3rd Dragoon Guards officers
British Army generals
Viscounts in the Peerage of Ireland
Peers of Ireland created by William III
Peers of Great Britain created by Queen Anne
Younger sons of earls
English MPs 1685–1687
English MPs 1705–1707
Members of the Parliament of Great Britain for English constituencies
British MPs 1707–1708
British MPs 1708–1710
British MPs 1710–1713